Pasti may refer to
Pasti (EP), a mini-album by Malaysian singer Daniel Lee Chee Hun
Matteo de' Pasti (1420-1467/1468), an Italian sculptor and medalist
Svetlana Pasti, Russian journalist

See also
 Pasty (disambiguation)
Pastis (disambiguation)
Badai Pasti Berlalu (disambiguation)